Cryptophagus pilosus is a species of silken fungus beetle native to Europe. It is also present in the northwestern United States, where it is sometimes found as a nest associate of the yellowjacket species Vespula pensylvanica.

References

External links
Images representing Cryptophagus at BOLD

Cryptophagidae
Beetles described in 1827
Beetles of Europe